Bayard Taylor (January 11, 1825December 19, 1878) was an American poet, literary critic, translator, travel author, and diplomat. As a poet, he was very popular, with a crowd of more than 4,000 attending a poetry reading once, which was a record that stood for 85 years. His travelogues were popular in both the United States and Great Britain. He served in diplomatic posts in Russia and Prussia.

Life and work
Taylor was born on January 11, 1825, in Kennett Square in Chester County, Pennsylvania. He was the fourth son, the first to survive to maturity, of the Quaker couple, Joseph and Rebecca (née Way) Taylor. His father was a wealthy farmer. Bayard's youngest brother was Charles Frederick Taylor, a Union Army colonel killed in action at the Battle of Gettysburg in 1863.

Bayard received his early instruction in an academy at West Chester, Pennsylvania, and later at nearby Unionville. At the age of seventeen, he was apprenticed to a printer in West Chester. The influential critic and editor Rufus Wilmot Griswold encouraged him to write poetry. The volume that resulted, Ximena, or the Battle of the Sierra Morena, and other Poems, was published in 1844 and dedicated to Griswold.

Using the money from his poetry and an advance for travel articles, he visited parts of England, France, Germany and Italy, making largely pedestrian tours for almost two years. He sent accounts of his travels to the Tribune, The Saturday Evening Post, and Gazette of the United States.

In 1846, a collection of his articles was published in two volumes as Views Afoot, or Europe seen with Knapsack and Staff. That publication resulted in an invitation to serve as an editorial assistant for Graham's Magazine for a few months in 1848. That same year, Horace Greeley, editor of the New York Tribune, hired Taylor and sent him to California to report on the gold rush. He returned by way of Mexico and published another two-volume collection of travel essays, El Dorado; or, Adventures in the Path of Empire (1850). Within two weeks of release, the books sold 10,000 copies in the U.S. and 30,000 in Great Britain.

In 1849 Taylor married Mary Agnew, who died of tuberculosis the next year. That same year, Taylor won a popular competition sponsored by P. T. Barnum to write an ode for the "Swedish Nightingale", singer Jenny Lind. His poem "Greetings to America" was set to music by Julius Benedict and performed by the singer at numerous concerts on her tour of the United States.

In 1851 he traveled to Egypt, where he followed the Nile River as far as 12° 30' N. He also traveled in Palestine and Mediterranean countries, writing poetry based on his experiences. Toward the end of 1852, he sailed from England to Calcutta, and then to China, where he joined the expedition of Commodore Matthew Calbraith Perry to Japan. The results of these journeys were published as A Journey to Central Africa; or, Life and Landscapes from Egypt to the Negro Kingdoms of the White Nile (1854); The Lands of the Saracen; or, Pictures of Palestine, Asia Minor, Sicily and Spain (1854); and A Visit to India, China and Japan in the Year 1853 (1855).

He returned to the U.S. on December 20, 1853, and undertook a successful public lecturer tour that extended from Maine to Wisconsin. After two years, he went to northern Europe to study Swedish life, language and literature. The trip inspired his long narrative poem Lars. His series of articles Swedish Letters to the Tribune were republished as Northern Travel: Summer and Winter Pictures (1857).

In Berlin in 1856, Taylor met the great German scientist Alexander von Humboldt, hoping to interview him for the New York Tribune. Humboldt was welcoming, and inquired whether they should speak English or German.  Taylor planned to go to central Asia, where Humboldt had traveled in 1829. Taylor informed Humboldt of Washington Irving's death; Humboldt had met him in Paris. He saw Humboldt again in 1857 at Potsdam.

In October 1857, he married Maria Hansen, the daughter of the Danish/German astronomer Peter Hansen. The couple spent the following winter in Greece. In 1859 Taylor returned to the American West and lectured at San Francisco.

In 1862, he was appointed to the U.S. diplomatic service as secretary of legation at St. Petersburg, and acting minister to Russia for a time during 1862–3 after the resignation of Ambassador Simon Cameron.

He published his first novel Hannah Thurston in 1863. The newspaper The New York Times first praised him for "break[ing] new ground with such assured success". A second much longer appreciation in the same newspaper was thoroughly negative, describing "one pointless, aimless situation leading to another of the same stamp, and so on in maddening succession". It concluded: "The platitudes and puerilities which might otherwise only raise a smile, when confronted with such pompous pretensions, excite the contempt of every man who has in him the feeblest instincts of common honesty in literature." It proved successful enough for his publisher to announce another novel from him the next year.

In 1864 Taylor and his wife Maria returned to the U.S. In 1866, Taylor traveled to Colorado and made a large loop through the northern mountains on horseback with a group that included William Byers, editor of the newspaper Rocky Mountain News. His letters describing this adventure were later compiled and published as Colorado: A Summer Trip.

In 1866, Taylor popularized outlaw James Fitzpatrick as swashbuckling hero Sandy Flash in his novel The Story of Kennett, set in Revolutionary War-era Pennsylvania. 

Taylor's novel Joseph and His Friend: A Story of Pennsylvania (1870), first serialized in The Atlantic, was described as a story of young man in rural Pennsylvania and "the troubles which arise from the want of a broader education and higher culture." The story is believed to be based on the poets Fitz-Greene Halleck and Joseph Rodman Drake, and since the late 20th century has been called America's first gay novel. Taylor spoke at the dedication of a monument to Halleck in his native town, Guilford, Connecticut. He said that in establishing this monument to an American poet "we symbolize the intellectual growth of the American people.... The life of the poet who sleeps here represents the long period of transition between the appearance of American poetry and the creation of an appreciative and sympathetic audience for it."

Taylor imitated and parodied the writings of various poets in Diversions of the Echo Club (London, 1873; Boston, 1876). In 1874 Taylor traveled to Iceland to report for the Tribune on the one thousandth anniversary of the first European settlement there.

On July 4, 1876, at the Centennial Exposition in Philadelphia, Bayard recited his National Ode to an enthusiastic crowd of more than four thousand, the largest audience for a poetry reading in the United States to that date and a record which stood until 1961. The ode was written at the request of the exhibition's organizers, after the task had been declined by several other eminent poets, including John Greenleaf Whittier and Henry Wadsworth Longfellow. The work was reprinted in newspapers across the country and later published as a book in two separate editions.

During March 1878, the U.S. Senate confirmed his appointment as United States Minister to Prussia. Mark Twain, who traveled to Europe on the same ship, was envious of Taylor's command of German.

Taylor's travel writings were widely quoted by congressmen seeking to defend racial discrimination. Richard Townshend (D-IL) quoted passages from Taylor such as "the Chinese are morally, the most debased people on the face of the earth" and "A Chinese city is the greatest of all abominations."

A few months after arriving in Berlin, Taylor died there on December 19, 1878. His body was returned to the U.S. and buried in Longwood Cemetery, Kennett Square, Pennsylvania. The New York Times published his obituary on its front page, referring to him as "a great traveler, both on land and paper". Shortly after his death, Henry Wadsworth Longfellow wrote a memorial poem in Taylor's memory, at the urging of Oliver Wendell Holmes, Sr.

Legacy and honors
Cedarcroft, Taylor's home from 1859 to 1874, which he built near Kennett Square, is preserved as a National Historic Landmark.
The Bayard Taylor School was added to the National Register of Historic Places in 1988.
 The Bayard Taylor Memorial Library is in Kennett Square.

Evaluations

Though he wanted to be known most as a poet, Taylor was mostly recognized as a travel writer during his lifetime. Modern critics have generally accepted him as technically skilled in verse, but lacking imagination and, ultimately, consider his work as a conventional example of 19th-century sentimentalism.

His translation of Faust, however, was recognized for its scholarly skill and remained in print through 1969. According to the 1920 edition of Encyclopedia Americana:

According to the 1911 edition of Encyclopædia Britannica:

In Appletons' Cyclopædia of American Biography of 1889, Edmund Clarence Stedman gives the following critique:

Published works
 Ximena, or the Battle of the Sierra Morena, and other Poems (1844)
 Views Afoot, or Europe seen with Knapsack and Staff (1846)
  Rhymes of Travel: Ballads and Poems (1849)
  El Dorado; or, Adventures in the Path of Empire (1850)
 Romances, Lyrics, and Songs (1852)
 Journey to Central Africa; or, Life and Landscapes from Egypt to the Negro Kingdoms of the White Nile, A (1854)
 A visit to India, China, and Japan in the year 1853 (1855)
  Poems of the Orient (Boston: Ticknor and Fields, 1855)
 Poems of Home and Travel (1856)
 Cyclopedia of Modern Travel (1856)
 Northern Travel: Summer and Winter Pictures (1857)
 ; or, Pictures of Palestine, Asia Minor, Sicily and Spain, The (1859)
 View A-Foot, or Europe Seen with Knapsack and Staff (1859)
 Life, Travels And Books Of Alexander Von Humboldt, The (1859)
 At Home and Abroad, First Series: A Sketch-book of Life, Scenery, and Men (1859)
 Cyclopaedia of Modern Travel Vol I (1861)
 Prose Writings: India, China, and Japan (1862)
 Travels in Greece and Russia, with an Excursion to Crete (1859)
 Poet's Journal (1863)
 Hanna Thurston (1863)
 John Godfrey's Fortunes Related by Himself: A story of American Life (1864)
 "Cruise On Lake Ladoga, A" (1864)
 " The Poems of Bayard Taylor" (1865)
 John Godrey's Fortunes Related By Himself – A story of American Life (1865)
 The Story of Kennett (1866)
 Visit To The Balearic Islands, Complete in Two Parts, A (1867)
 Picture of St. John, The (1867)
 Colorado: A Summer Trip (1867)
 "Little Land Of Appenzell, The" (1867)
 "Island of Maddalena with a Distant View of Caprera, The" (1868)
 "Land Of Paoli, The" (1868)
 "Catalonian Bridle-Roads" (1868)
 "Kyffhauser And Its Legend, The" (1868)
 By-Ways Of Europe (1869)
 Joseph and His Friend: A Story of Pennsylvania (1870)
 Ballad of Abraham Lincoln, The (1870)
 "Sights In And Around Yedo" (1871)
 Northern Travel (1871)
 Japan in Our Day (1872)
 Masque of the Gods, The (1872)
 "Heart Of Arabia, The" (1872)
 Travels in South Africa (1872)
 At Home and Abroad: A Sketch-Book of Life, Scenery and Men (1872)
 Diversions of the Echo Club (1873)
 Lars: A Pastoral of Norway (1873)
 Wonders of the Yellowstone – The Illustrated Library of Travel, Exploration and Adventure (with James Richardson) (1873)
 Northern Travel: Summer and Winter Pictures – Sweden, Denmark and Lapland (1873)
 Lake Regions of Central Africa (1873)
 Prophet: A Tragedy, The. (1874)
 Home Pastorals Ballads & Lyrics (1875) 
 Egypt And Iceland In The Year 1874 (1875)
 Boys of Other Countries: Stories for American Boys (1876)
 Echo Club and Other Literary Diversions (1876)
 Picturesque Europe Part Thirty-Six (1877)
 National Ode: The Memorial Freedom Poem, The (1877)
 Bismarck: His Authentic Biography (1877)
 "Assyrian Night-Song" (August 1877)
 Prince Deukalion (1878)
 Picturesque Europe (1878)
 Studies in German Literature (1879)
 Faust: A Tragedy translated in the Original Metres  (1890)
 Travels in Arabia (1892)
 A school history of Germany (1882)

Editions
Collected editions of his Poetical Works and his Dramatic Works were published at Boston in 1888; his Life and Letters (Boston, 2 vols., 1884) were edited by his wife and Horace Scudder.

Marie Hansen Taylor translated into German Bayard's Greece (Leipzig, 1858), Hannah Thurston (Hamburg, 1863), Story of Kennett (Gotha, 1868), Tales of Home (Berlin, 1879), Studies in German Literature (Leipzig, 1880), and notes to Faust, both parts (Leipzig, 1881). After her husband's death, she edited, with notes, his Dramatic Works (1880), and in the same year his Poems in a "Household Edition", and brought together his Critical Essays and Literary Notes. In 1885 she prepared a school edition of Lars, with notes and a sketch of its author's life.

Notes

References

Attribution

External links 

Bayard Taylor Library Biography
 
 
 
  Online Books by Bayard Taylor from The Online Books Page
 Works with text by Bayard Taylor
Guide to the Bayard Taylor Collection 1850–1871 at the University of Chicago Special Collections Research Center

1825 births
1878 deaths
American travel writers
Holy Land travellers
19th-century American poets
19th-century American novelists
American male novelists
American literary critics
Ambassadors of the United States to Germany
People from Kennett Square, Pennsylvania
Lecturers
19th-century American diplomats
American male poets
19th-century American journalists
American male journalists
19th-century male writers
Translators of Johann Wolfgang von Goethe